Vitalii Nakonechnyi (Ukrainian: Віталій Наконечний, born 2 August 1986 in Kalush) is a Ukrainian gymnast.

At the 2011 World Artistic Gymnastics Championships, he competed in the team all-around event, joining Oleg Vernyayev, Nikolai Kuksenkov, Oleg Stepko, Igor Radivilov and Roman Zozulya to finish 5th. He competed for the national team at the 2012 Summer Olympics in the Men's artistic team all-around and the Men's pommel horse. He competed in a team with Mykola Kuksenkov, Igor Radivilov, Oleg Stepko and Oleg Verniaiev for Ukraine in the team final finishing in 4th place. In the pommel horse final he finished in 6th place with a score of 14.766.

References

Ukrainian male artistic gymnasts
1986 births
People from Kalush, Ukraine
Living people
Olympic gymnasts of Ukraine
Gymnasts at the 2012 Summer Olympics
Sportspeople from Ivano-Frankivsk Oblast
21st-century Ukrainian people